Helga Lopez, née Schmidt (7 August 1952 – 12 June 2022) was a German politician. A member of the Social Democratic Party of Germany, she served in the Bundestag from 2005 to 2009.

Lopez died on 12 June 2022 at the age of 69.

References

1952 births
2022 deaths
Members of the Bundestag 2005–2009
Members of the Bundestag for the Social Democratic Party of Germany
Members of the Bundestag for Hesse
21st-century German politicians
21st-century German women politicians
People from Giessen